NLRB v. Kentucky River Community Care, Inc., 532 U.S. 706 (2001), is a US labor law case, concerning the scope of labor rights in the United States.

Facts
Staff working for Kentucky River Community Care, who worked as nurses, petitioned the National Labor Relations Board to be recognized as a bargaining unit to get a collective agreement for their workplace. The employer argued that registered nurses had no rights to bargain, as they were "supervisors" and not "employees" under the National Labor Relations Act of 1935 §2(11).

Judgment
Five members of the Supreme Court held that six registered nurses who exercised supervisory status over others fell into the 'professional' exemption. Justice Scalia gave the opinion of the court, joined in full by Chief Justice Rehnquist and Justices O'Connor, Kennedy and Thomas. He said the following:

Justice Stevens dissented in part, joined by Justices Souter, Ginsburg and Breyer, arguing that if "the 'supervisor' is construed too broadly", without regard to the Act's purpose, protection "is effectively nullified".

See also

 United States labor law

References

External links
 

United States labor case law
United States Supreme Court cases
United States Supreme Court cases of the Rehnquist Court
2001 in United States case law